Sir Charles Whitworth (c. 1721 – 22 August 1778) was a British politician who sat in the House of Commons for 31 years from 1747 to 1778. He was known for his expertise in statistics and finance.

Whitworth was the son of Francis Whitworth, Member of Parliament for Minehead from 1723 to 1742 and was educated at Westminster School and at Lincoln's Inn.  

Whitworth represented the constituencies of Minehead from 1747 until 1761, and Bletchingley until 1768, in which year he was knighted. He then represented Minehead until 1774, East Looe until 1775 and Saltash until his death in 1778. He served in the army for a short time and was made lieutenant-governor of Gravesend and Tilbury for life in 1758.   Whitworth was Chairman of Ways and Means from 1768 until his death.

The major contribution made by Sir Charles to the statistics of Great Britain consisted of the production of the first complete Balance of Trade (Visible trade) for the country together with individual commercial accounts of Great Britain and all known countries during the period 1697–1773, a major task he completed two years before his death.

Whitworth was an active early member of the Society for the Encouragement of Arts, Manufactures and Commerce in 1754.

He married Martha, the daughter of Richard Shelley, a commissioner of the stamp office. He had three sons and four daughters, and his heir was his eldest son, Charles Whitworth, 1st Earl Whitworth.

References

1720s births
1778 deaths
People educated at Westminster School, London
Members of Lincoln's Inn
Knights Bachelor
Members of the Parliament of Great Britain for constituencies in Cornwall
Members of the Parliament of Great Britain for English constituencies
British MPs 1747–1754
British MPs 1754–1761
British MPs 1761–1768
British MPs 1768–1774
British MPs 1774–1780